is a village located in Shimajiri District, Okinawa Prefecture, Japan. The village occupies the entirety of Aguni Island. As of 2022, the village had an estimated population of 672 and a population density of 87.8 persons per km².

Geography

Aguni is located in the East China Sea. Aguni is a low-lying island with its highest point only reaching .

Aguni faces Tonaki and the Kerama Islands to the south and Kume Island to the southwest. The town consists of three districts: Hama, Higashi, and Nishi.

Climate

History
Aguni was settled early in the history of the Ryukyu Islands. The island has remains of both shell middens and gusuku castle remains. Aguni appears in the earliest written record as Awaguni, and was placed under the administration of Kume Island. Aguni was home to merchants and mariners in the sailing period of the Ryukyu Kingdom. After the end of the Ryukyu Kingdom, and the abolition of the han system in Japan in 1879, Aguni became part of Okinawa Prefecture. In 1880 the population of Aguni stood at 3,099 residents, and reached 4,966 by 1903. The island saw discontent and violent protest by peasants between 1880 and 1881, which were ultimately suppressed by the authorities on Kume Island. The Village of Aguni was formally established in 1908

Aguni was invaded by the United States as part of the Battle of Okinawa during World War II. The island, along with the Kerama Islands, was overtaken by Allied forces after aerial and naval bombardment on March 23, 1945. Civil administration of the village ended after the American invasion. 30 leaders from the village were appointed to keep order on the island. The mayor of Aguni was reappointed in 1946 by the American administration, and mayoral and village council elections resumed in 1948.

The population of Aguni decreased rapidly after World War II, due to both an aging population and the emigration of residents from the island. The village had 960 residents in 2000, and at present has fallen to 672.

Government

Aguni is administered from the village hall in the Higashi district.

The Uruma City Council consists of 7 members who serve a four-year term, and are led by a chairperson (Fumio Tamayose) and vice-chairperson (Masanori Miyasato) of the council.

Transportation

Air

Aguni is connected to Okinawa Island via Aguni Airport. The airport was constructed in 1978 after the reversion of Okinawa Prefecture to Japan. Aguni can be reached from Naha in only 20 minutes.

Ferry

Aguni is connected to the main island of Okinawa by ferry between the Port of Aguni and the Port of Tomari in Naha. The Port of Aguni came under the administration of Okinawa Prefecture in 1972 after the reversion of the prefecture to Japan. Ferry service between Aguni and Naha takes approximately two hours.

Education

References

External links

 Aguni official website 

Villages in Okinawa Prefecture
Populated coastal places in Japan